Karumandi Chellipalayam is a panchayat town in Erode district in the Indian state of Tamil Nadu.

Demographics
 India census, Karumandi Chellipalayam had a population of 20,143. Males constitute 49% of the population and females 51%. Karumandi Chellipalayam has an average literacy rate of 69%, higher than the national average of 59.5%: male literacy is 75%, and female literacy is 63%. In Karumandi Chellipalayam, 9% of the population is under 6 years of age.

Economy
Turmeric & plantain cultivations are of important here. Turmeric powder packing industry is also here. 
It has a weekly Sunday market.

Government and politics

Services
 Karumandi Chellipalayam branch post office.

Roads
 Off Salem-Kochi Highway.
 Perundurai-Kanjikoil road.

Neighborhoods
 Kanjikoil.
 Perundurai.
 Kavindapadi.
 Vijayamangalam.
 Ingur.
 Nasiyanur.
 Thingalur.
 Peddampalayam.

References

Cities and towns in Erode district